was the governor of Chiba Prefecture in Japan from 2001 to 2009. A graduate of Tokyo Woman's Christian University, she was the first female governor of Chiba and the third in Japanese history. She was first elected in 2001. In September 2001 she canceled a controversial plan to reclaim the Sanbanze wetlands as landfill. Historian Jeff Kingston called this act "a major victory for activists."

References

External links 

  

1932 births
Living people
Japanese feminists
Japanese women journalists
Female Japanese governors
Female members of the House of Councillors (Japan)
Members of the House of Councillors (Japan)
Governors of Chiba Prefecture